Scheinman is a surname. Notable people with the surname include:

Adam Scheinman, American screenwriter and former professional tennis player
Andrew Scheinman, American film and television producer
Jenny Scheinman (born 1973), American jazz violinist
Pinhas Scheinman (1912–1999), Israeli politician
Victor Scheinman (1942–2016), American pioneer in the field of robotics